The 1973 Wake Forest Demon Deacons football team was an American football team that represented Wake Forest University in the Atlantic Coast Conference during the 1973 NCAA Division I football season. In its first season under head coach Chuck Mills, the team compiled a 1–9–1 record (0–5–1 against ACC opponents) and finished last in the conference.

Schedule

Personnel

Season summary

Florida State

William & Mary

at Richmond

at Texas

Team leaders

References

Wake Forest
Wake Forest Demon Deacons football seasons
Wake Forest Demon Deacons football